This is a comprehensive discography of official recordings by Red, an American Christian rock band from Nashville, Tennessee. Red has released 7 studio albums, 5 extended plays, 44 singles, and 16 music videos.

Albums

Studio albums

Other albums

Extended plays

Singles

Other charted songs

Music videos

Compilation appearances

References

External links
 
 

Christian music discographies
Discographies of American artists
Heavy metal group discographies